Hawaii Route 8930, known as the Kualakai Parkway and previously as the North–South Road, broke ground in 2005 and was completed in 2010. The  highway connects the H-1 freeway in the north end to Kapolei Parkway in the south end in Kapolei.

History
The highway was completed in three phases. The first phase included the completion of a new overpass to accommodate the new four-lane highway to pass under the H-1 freeway. The second phase built the four-lane highway from Kapolei Parkway up to the junction with Route 7110 and cost more than $12 million. The third and final phase connected the second phase with the H-1 freeway. The highway was completed and dedicated on February 11, 2010, and named Kualakai Parkway. The name Kualakai traditionally means "to unite people in new lands".

Major intersections

References

External links

8930
Transportation in Honolulu County, Hawaii